Harold Robert Leslie Fox  (born 17 November 1889) was the General Manager of the Jamaica Government Railway at the time of its centenary in 1945.

Fox was the son of Edith Blounts and Isaac Fox of Halse Hall, Jamaica. He went to school at Epsom College in England then studied Mining and Civil Engineering at MIT, graduating BSc in 1912. After graduating he worked on railways in Canada and the West Indies. He served in the First World War in France with the Royal Engineers reaching the rank of captain.

Fox was a member of the Institution of Civil Engineers. He was appointed Commander of the Order of the British Empire (CBE) in the 1946 New Year Honours.

Publications
The Jamaica Railway 1845–1945, H R Fox, The Railway Magazine Volume 91 Number 560, Pages 313–317, November and December 1945.

References

People of the railways of Jamaica
Year of death missing
Commanders of the Order of the British Empire
Royal Engineers officers
British Army personnel of World War I
British civil engineers
People educated at Epsom College
Massachusetts Institute of Technology alumni
1889 births